Woo Jin-won (October 25, 1978), better known by his stage name Masta Wu(), is a South Korean rapper, songwriter and producer. His previous stage name was Ginnwon. He was also a part of the hip hop project duo YMGA.

Career
After being an underground rapper, Woo signed with YG Entertainment. He released his first album, Masta Peace in 2003, and his second album Brand Wu Year in 2007.

In 2014, he was one of the producers of the talent show Show Me The Money 3.

He wrote several songs for his label-mates, for example project duo Hi Suhyun, solo singer Lee Hi and girl band 2NE1. As of April 2015 he has 74 songs credited to his name at the Korea Music Copyright Association.

In 2016, he announced his departure from YG Entertainment to establish his own label.

Discography

Albums
 Masta Peace (2003)
 Brand Wu Year (2007)

EPs
 Father (2020)

Charted songs

References

External links

 Masta Wu Official Twitter

1978 births
Living people
South Korean hip hop record producers
South Korean hip hop singers
South Korean electronic musicians
Stanford University alumni
South Korean songwriters
South Korean male rappers
20th-century South Korean male singers
21st-century South Korean male singers